The Complutensian Polyglot Bible is the name given to the first printed polyglot of the entire Bible. The edition was initiated and financed by Cardinal Francisco Jiménez de Cisneros (1436–1517) and published by Complutense University in Alcalá de Henares, Spain. It includes the first printed editions of the Greek New Testament, the complete Septuagint, and the Targum Onkelos. Of the 600 six-volume sets which were printed, only 123 are known to have survived to date.

History

Precedents
The polyglot bible was the result of Spain's long-lasting tradition of translations of texts. Through centuries the intellectual class of the Iberian peninsula had developed a deep understanding of the issues of translation and the difficulty of conveying, or even interpreting meaning correctly across languages. Religious texts were known to be particularly difficult due to their high metaphorical content and how dependent on the context in which they were written they tended to be. This sparked a debate in Spain about the convenience of continuing the translation of religious texts and the best way to do it over a century prior to the reformation. The customary answer to this debate was to ask religious authorities to examine the translation and cross-check different translations to Castillian, but that in turn created a debate about the qualifications of the religious authority itself to properly translate from the original sources. One of the answers to this debate was the polyglot bible, which Cisneros hoped would end the issue forever.

Translation process
The works started on 1502 and took 15 years to be completed. At great personal expense, Cardinal Cisneros acquired many manuscripts and invited the top religious scholars of the day, to work on the ambitious task of compiling a massive and complete polyglot "to revive the languishing study of the Sacred Scriptures". Diego López de Zúñiga, was the chief editor and fluent in Latin as well as both Aramaic and Arabic. He was given a team of various translators. Converted translators and academics were favoured and specifically sought since they were fluent in the source languages and the cultures of the texts.  Second in command, Alfonso de Zamora (14761544) was a converted Jewish scholar, an expert in Talmudic studies, and spoke Hebrew as his first language. Other conversos working on the project were Alfonso de Alcalá, Pablo de Coronel. Demetrius Ducas a scholar from Crete, Hernán Núñez de Toledo ("The Pincian") and Juan de Vergara were in charge of the translation from Greek manuscripts. Antonio de Nebrija was specifically called for the translation of the Vulgate. Hernán Núñez de Toledo was also the chief Latinist.<ref> Mendoza, J. Carlos Vizuete; Llamazares, Fernando; Sánchez, Julio Martín; Mancha, Universidad de Castilla-La (2002). Los arzobispos de Toledo y la universidad española: 5 de marzo-3 de junio, Iglesia de San Pedro Mártir, Toledo. Univ de Castilla La Mancha' '''</ref>
The scholars met in Alcalá de Henares, a city near Madrid also known by its Latin name Complutum, at Complutense University. 

The New Testament was completed and printed in 1514, but its publication was delayed while work on the Old Testament continued, so they could be published together as a complete work.

Erasmus and publication privileges
In the meantime, word of the Complutensian project reached Desiderius Erasmus in Rotterdam, who produced his own printed edition of the Greek New Testament. Erasmus obtained an exclusive four-year publishing privilege from Emperor Maximilian and Pope Leo X in 1516. Theodore Beza's Greek NT Text was used primarily, along with Erasmus' Greek NT Text and with various readings from the Complutensian Greek NT Text to form the Textus Receptus published by the Elzevir Brothers in 1633. Erasmus' later editions were a secondary source for the King James Version of the New Testament. The Complutensian Polyglot Bible was a tertiary source for the 1611 King James Version.

The Complutensian Old Testament was completed in 1517. Because of Erasmus' exclusive privilege, publication of the Polyglot was delayed until Pope Leo X could sanction it in 1520. It is believed to have not been distributed widely before 1522. Cardinal Cisneros died in July 1517, five months after the Polyglot's completion, and never saw its publication.

 Contents 

The Complutensian Polyglot Bible was published as a six-volume set. The first four volumes contain the Old Testament. Each page consists of three parallel columns of text: Hebrew on the outside, the Latin Vulgate in the middle (edited by Antonio de Nebrija), and the Greek Septuagint on the inside. On each page of the Pentateuch, the Aramaic text (the Targum Onkelos) and its own Latin translation are added at the bottom. The fifth volume, the New Testament, consists of parallel columns of Greek and the Latin Vulgate. The sixth volume contains various Hebrew, Aramaic, and Greek dictionaries and study aids. For the Greek text, the minuscules 140, 234, and 432 were probably used.

Jerome's Latin version of the Old Testament was placed between the Greek and Hebrew versions, symbolizing the Roman Church of Christ being surrounded and crucified by the Greek Church and the Jews. This text was collated by Antonio de Nebrija from manuscript sources, but was left uncorrected. Nebrija eventually resigned from the project after Cisneros refused to allow him to improve the translation in deference to the desires of the Papacy.

A full-size (folio) facsimile edition was published in Valencia 1984–87, reproducing the Bible text (volumes 1-5) from the copy in the Library of the Jesuit Society at Rome, and the rarer sixth volume of dictionaries from the copy in the Complutense University Library.

The typeface devised for the Complutensian by Arnaldo Guillén de Brocar has been regarded by typographers such as Robert Proctor as the apex of Greek typographical development in early printing, before Aldus Manutius' manuscript-based typefaces took over the market for the next two centuries. Proctor based his 1903 Otter Greek typeface on the Polyglot; the  Greek Font Society's GFS Complutensian Greek is likewise based on the Polyglot.

 See also 
 Novum Instrumentum omne Editio Regia Codex Complutensis I 

References

Further reading
 Lyell, James P. R. (1917), Cardinal Ximenes, Statesman, Ecclesiastic, Soldier, and Man of Letters: with an Account of the Complutensian Polyglot Bible. London: Coptic House, 1917.
 Rummel, Erika. Jiménez de Cisneros, On the Threshold of Spain’s Golden Age. Tempe, Arizona: Arizona Center for Medieval and Renaissance Studies, 1999.

 External links 
Catholic Encyclopedia: Editions of the Bible
Catholic Encyclopedia "Polyglot Bibles"
DUKE Magazine
GFS Complutensian Greek
Robert Proctor's announcement of his Otter Greek font: A New Fount of Greek Type, Burlington Magazine for Connoisseurs, Vol. 2, No. 6 (Aug., 1903), pp. 358-360
Blog entry on Complutensian typography
Scanned copies
Complutensian Polyglot Bible WDL
 Biblia Políglota Complutense. Volúmenes I-V. Biblioteca digital de Castilla-La Mancha.
"Vetus testamentū multiplici lingua nūc primo impressum ... adiūcta vnicuique sua latina interpretatione", 1514, volúmenes II-VI, digitalizada en la Biblioteca Digital Hispánica de la'' Spanish National Library(In Spanish)

1520 books
Early printed Bibles
Greek New Testament
Polyglot bibles
History of translation
Editions of the Vulgate